Ryan is an unincorporated community  in Shelby County, Alabama, United States.

References

Unincorporated communities in Shelby County, Alabama
Unincorporated communities in Alabama